Klaus is both a German given name and a surname.

Klaus may also refer to:
Klaus, Vorarlberg, a town in Austria
Klaus Advanced Computing Building, at the Georgia Institute of Technology
Klaus (storm), a 2009 European cyclone
Hurricane Klaus, used in 1984 and 1990 to name two category 1 hurricanes, retired after 1990 season and replaced with Kyle
Klaus (comics), a 2015 comic book mini-series
Klaus (film), a 2019 animated Christmas film
Klaus, a prayer house in Hasidic Judaism